The Wildlife Docs is a 30-minute television program produced by Natural 9 Entertainment which  documents the surprising, exotic, and challenging lives of a veterinary staff that care for over 12,000 animals at Busch Gardens in Tampa. The Wildlife Docs is hosted by Rachel Reenstra, and appears as part of the Litton's Weekend Adventure live-action kids and family series programming block on the ABC TV network on Saturday or Sunday mornings, depending on local ABC TV affiliate scheduling preferences.

This series is presented in conjunction between SeaWorld Parks & Entertainment and Litton Entertainment. It was launched on October 5, 2013. It joined The CW's One Magnificent Morning block on October 6, 2018.

References

External links
 
 

2013 American television series debuts
2018 American television series endings
2010s American children's television series
American Broadcasting Company original programming
American children's education television series
Litton Entertainment
SeaWorld Parks & Entertainment
The CW original programming